Owasco is an unincorporated community in Clay Township, Carroll County, Indiana. It is part of the Lafayette, Indiana Metropolitan Statistical Area.

History
A post office was established at Owasco in 1883. It was named after Owasco Lake, in New York.

Geography

References

External links

Unincorporated communities in Carroll County, Indiana
Unincorporated communities in Indiana
Lafayette metropolitan area, Indiana